Agylla dognini is a kind of moth of the family Erebidae.  It was described by George Hampson in 1900 and is found in Bolivia.

References

Moths described in 1900
dognini
Moths of South America